Dexter Lewis (born February 2, 1981 in Cahuita de Talamanca) is a Costa Rican professional football goalkeeper playing for Limon.

Club career
Lewis made his professional debut with second division side Sagrada Familia and in the Primera División on 7 May 2000 for Limonense against San Carlos. He also played for Cartaginés and Ramonense before joining Pérez Zeledón.

On March 8, 2015, Lewis scored his first goal against As Puma.

International career
Lewis has made two appearances for the Costa Rica national football team, his debut coming in a friendly against New Zealand on March 24, 2007.

References

External links
 2010–2013 league stats – Nación
 
 Player profile – Alajuelense

1981 births
Living people
People from Limón Province
Association football goalkeepers
Costa Rican footballers
Costa Rica international footballers
2007 UNCAF Nations Cup players
2007 CONCACAF Gold Cup players
A.D. Ramonense players
Santos de Guápiles footballers
Municipal Pérez Zeledón footballers
L.D. Alajuelense footballers
Copa Centroamericana-winning players
Liga FPD players